De Dietrich Bugatti refers colloquially to a number of early automobile designs by  Ettore Bugatti, known as the Types 2 through 7.  Importantly, the vehicle known as the Type 2 of 1901 was designed by Bugatti before he joined the automobile manufacturer Lorraine-Dietrich in Niederbronn, Alsace, Germany following its successful reception.  Types 3-7 were produced for De Dietrich between 1902 and 1904.

Type 2 
The Type 2 was a prototype automobile designed and built by Ettore Bugatti in 1901 with financial support from a Count Gulinelli. It won an award at the Milan Trade Fair that year, and gained the notice of Baron Adrien de Turckheim, managing director of the Lorraine-Dietrich automobile factory in Niederbronn in the then-German Alsace.

Type 3 and 4
Types 3-4 were Bugatti's initial works for De Dietrich.

Type 5, 6, and 7
Types 5-7 were also designed by Bugatti while with De Dietrich through 1904.  Approximately 100 Types 1-7 were produced from 1902 through 1904.

See also
 Bugatti

Bugatti automobiles
First car made by manufacturer

References